Two Cops is a South Korean television series starring Jo Jung-suk, Lee Hye-ri, and Kim Seon-ho. The series aired on Mondays and Tuesdays at 22:00 (KST), from November 27, 2017, to January 16, 2018.

Synopsis
A single-minded, dedicated violent crimes detective who finds himself cohabiting his own body with the soul of a sleazy con artist; and falls in love with a feisty rookie reporter.

Cast

Main
Jo Jung-suk as Cha Dong-tak / Gong Su-chang
Cha Dong-tak: A dedicated and fierce detective in the violent crimes unit, who is serious and inflexible in life; but possesses an awkward and endearing charm. 
Gong Su-chang: A skilled con man who tricks people with his sly techniques.
Lee Hye-ri as Song Ji-an
A determined and feisty rookie reporter trying to clear her late father's name.
Kim Seon-ho as Gong Su-chang
A con-artist whose soul inhabits Cha Dong-tak's body.

Supporting
Hoya as Dokgo Sung-hyeok
A fellow detective who trusts Cha Dong-tak with all his heart. He is from a rich family and likes to brag about it, but he's also smart and a positive thinker.
Lee Si-eon as Yong-pal
A bar owner who is known for his knife skills and loyalty. 
Moon Ji-in as Gil Da-jung 
Kim Young-woong as Park Dong-gi 
A detective who is a troublemaker and mood maker. He is loyal and constantly seeks justice. 
Kim Seo-kyung
Song Ji-an's friend.
Park Hoon as Tak Jae-hee
A prosecutor who is Ji-an's friend
Oh Eui-shik as Lee Ho-tae	
Jung Hae-kyun as Ma Jin-kook
Ryu Tae-ho as Noh Young-man
Choi Il-hwa as Tak Jung-hwan 
Lee Dae-yeon as Yoo Jung-man 
Lee Jae-won as Lee Doo-sik 
Im Se-mi as Ko Bong-sook
Ryu Hye-rin as Miss Bong
Lee Jin-hee as Woo Hye-in the widow of detective Cho Hang-joon, former partner of Cha Dong-tak.
Kim Myung-seon as nurse
Yoon Bong-kil as Dokki, Yong-pal's minion

Special appearance
Kim Min-jong as Jo Hang-jun (ep 1–2)
Park Jin-joo as nurse Song Gyung-mi(ep 3)
Choi Won-hong (ep 7–9)
Min Sung-wook as Manager Park(ep 8–12)
Ji Il-joo as Kyung-chul (ep 14–16)
Jo Woo-ri as Min-ah (ep 13–16)
Jang In-sub as Jo Min-suk (ep 22-)

Production
Han Ji-min was offered the leading role but she declined. 
Two Cops serves as the second production of People Story Company (the company behind The Emperor: Owner of the Mask).
The series is based on a script by Byun Sang-soon which was one of the winners of the 2016 KBS TV Drama Miniseries Competition. The series was planned for broadcast on KBS 2TV (under the production of People Story Company) as a prize for winning the competition, but due to "irreconcilable differences" between KBS, People Story Company and writer Byun, it was shelved before MBC decided to pick the series up for broadcast. Instead, KBS 2TV aired Don't Trust Her (later re-titled as Witch at Court).

Original soundtrack

Part 1

Part 2

Part 3

Part 4

Part 5

Part 6

Part 7

Ratings 
 In the table below,  represent the lowest ratings and  represent the highest ratings.
 NR denotes that the series did not rank in the top 20 daily programs on that date.

Awards and nominations

References

External links
  
 
 

2017 South Korean television series debuts
Korean-language television shows
MBC TV television dramas
South Korean fantasy television series
South Korean romantic comedy television series
2018 South Korean television series endings